ICON: The Best of Erykah Badu is a compilation album by American R&B artist Erykah Badu, released in August 2010 under Universal Motown. It's the first compilation of Badu's hit songs throughout her music career. The collection consists of 12 hit songs, as "On & On", "Love of My Life", You Got Me with The Roots, "Tyrone" and "Bag Lady".

Track listing

References

External links
Erykah-badu.com
universalmotown.com/artists

2010 compilation albums
Erykah Badu albums
Neo soul compilation albums
Contemporary R&B compilation albums
Hip hop compilation albums